Li Hongzhong (born 13 August 1956) is a Chinese politician, who is currently the first-ranking vice chairperson of the Standing Committee of the National People's Congress and a member of the Politburo of the Chinese Communist Party. Born in Shenyang, Li spent much of his early career in Guangdong province, including as mayor, then party secretary of Shenzhen. He was transferred to Hubei province in 2007 and would go on to serve as Governor and party secretary there. He served as the Communist Party Secretary of Tianjin between 2016 and 2022.

During his term in Hubei, Li generated controversy after grabbing a recording pen from the hand of the female journalist Liu Jie and refusing to answer her question. Li later refused to apologize, despite an open letter signed by over 200 intellectuals including People's Daily editor Zhou Ruijin demanding Li to resign.

Biography
Li was born in Shenyang, but traces his ancestry to Changle County, Shandong province.  During the Cultural Revolution, he performed manual labour as a sent-down youth in Sujiatun District, Shenyang, Liaoning Province. In 1978, he earned admission to the history department at Jilin University.  After he graduated, Li was sent to work at the government.  He worked for the General Office of the Shenyang municipal government, then a secretary at the ministry of electronics industry.  In 1988 he was sent to Guangdong province, where he would go on to spend two decades of his political career. He successively served as the mayor and party chief of Huizhou City, then the vice governor of Guangdong, then in 2003, the acting mayor and mayor of Shenzhen, China's most prominent Special Economic Zone.

In March 2005, he was named Communist Party chief of Shenzhen. In November 2007, he was transferred to Hubei province, where he took on the office of deputy party chief, governor, and then finally in December 2010, provincial party chief. During his Hubei governorship, the Shishou incident and Deng Yujiao incident occurred in the province.

For some reason, during the elections for Vice-President at the 2013 National People's Congress, Li Hongzhong received one write-in vote. In preparation for the Third Plenum of the 18th Central Committee, Li Hongzhong was only one of two regional officials (the other was Huang Qifan) selected to be part of the drafting committee on the "resolution for deepening reform." On June 1, 2015, the Dongfang Zhixing ferry sank, causing the deaths of some 442 people. Only 12 people were rescued, but the Hubei government granted accolades to some 99 organizations and 253 individuals.

On January 15, 2016, at a meeting of the provincial party standing committee, Li endorsed the "Xi Jinping leadership core" principle, stating, "the Politburo and its Standing Committee are the core leaders [hexin] of the party, General Secretary Xi Jinping is the core leader of the party center. To proactively maintain the authority of the party center means maintaining the leading core of General Secretary Xi Jinping."

In September 2016, Li was appointed the Communist Party Secretary of Tianjin, replacing Huang Xingguo, who was dismissed for corruption. The appointment meant that Li would likely advance one step further to the Politburo at the 19th Party Congress in 2017.

Deng Yujiao incident
In March 2010, when Li Hongzhong, then Governor of Hubei, was attending the 11th National People's Congress in Beijing, Beijing Times journalist Liu Jie asked him to comment on the case of Deng Yujiao, a Hubei pedicurist who killed a government official who tried to rape her. Li refused to comment on the case, which was considered an embarrassment to the government of Hubei, and instead grabbed the recorder from her. The incident was widely reported in Chinese media, but Li refused to apologize to Liu Jie, stating that she stuttered when he asked her which newspaper she represented, and that he was unsure about her identity. A week later, at least 210 intellectuals and journalists, including dramatist Sha Yexin, scholars Cui Weiping and Hu Yong, and the prominent former People's Daily editor Zhou Ruijin, signed an open letter demanding Li to resign.

The petition was ultimately unsuccessful, as Li Hongzhong was promoted to party chief (i.e. top office) of Hubei in December. However, in the face of media scrutiny, Li made a statement suggesting that he was in favour of the media reporting the Shishou incident and the Deng Yujiao incident, as long as the news media conducted itself in a "fair and objective" manner.

References 

Living people
1956 births
Governors of Hubei
Chinese Communist Party politicians from Shandong
People's Republic of China politicians from Shandong
Political office-holders in Guangdong
Members of the 20th Politburo of the Chinese Communist Party
Members of the 19th Politburo of the Chinese Communist Party
Members of the 18th Central Committee of the Chinese Communist Party
Alternate members of the 17th Central Committee of the Chinese Communist Party
Alternate members of the 16th Central Committee of the Chinese Communist Party
Delegates to the 10th National People's Congress
Jilin University alumni
Politicians from Weifang
Mayors of Shenzhen